Kemankeş Kara Ali Paşa was a Turkish Ottoman statesman. He was the 80th grand vizier of the Ottoman Empire from 1623 to 1624. during the reign of Sultan Murad IV. He played an crucial role in the Ottoman–Safavid War (1623–39). He was highly influential especially with the Janesaries.

See also
 List of Ottoman Grand Viziers

References

17th-century Grand Viziers of the Ottoman Empire
Turks from the Ottoman Empire
People executed by ligature strangulation
17th-century executions by the Ottoman Empire
Executed people from the Ottoman Empire
Year of birth unknown